Izyum Trail or Izyum Warpath (Russian: Изюмский шлях) is a historic route used by the Crimean Nogays in the 16th and 17th centuries to penetrate into Sloboda Ukraine and then invade Muscovite Russia. The route branched off the Muravsky Trail in the upper reaches of the Orash River and, after crossing the Seversky Donets at a convenient ford near Izyum, continued north in the direction of the Great Abatis Border. In the mid-17th century, the route fell into disuse owing to the establishment of Kharkiv and other Cossack forts in the Sloboda Ukraine.

See also
Black Trail

Roads in Ukraine
Crimean Khanate
Tsardom of Russia
Donets basin